The 1976–77 Detroit Titans men's basketball team represented the University of Detroit in the 1976–77 NCAA Division I men's basketball season.  The team played at Calihan Hall in Detroit.

The Titans were led by head coach Dick Vitale, a former assistant coach at Rutgers University, who came to Detroit in 1973.  He had quick success at UD, finishing 17-9 in his first season (1973–74), and began to recruit talent to his rising program, bringing guard Dennis Boyd, guard John Long, forward Terry Tyler and guard Terry Duerod to the Titans program, all of whom would eventually play in the NBA.

The 1976-77 featured a 21-game Titans winning streak, starting on December 6, 1976 with a 113-45 win over Oakland University, and the streak featured a win over #8 Arizona 70-68, winning on a Boyd shot as time expired, a road victory, 99-94 over Michigan State in East Lansing, and entered the rankings at #19, winning over St. Bonaventure 78-62 on February 9, 1977.  Gaining national attention, the highlight of the season came on February 16, 1977, as #15 Detroit went on the road to then #6 and eventual national champion Marquette.  Boyd again performed the last second heroics, as he took the jump shot with two seconds remaining, scoring and giving Detroit a historic 64-63 victory.

The Titans would finish the regular season 25-2 and received a bid to the 1977 NCAA Division I Basketball Tournament.  Detroit defeated Middle Tennessee in the opening round, with a double-double of 29 points and 15 rebounds from Terry Tyler, and would then lose to the Michigan Wolverines 86-81 in the regional semi-finals.  The Titans finished with a stellar record of 26-3 and a final # 12 ranking on the season.  (A December 1976 loss against Minnesota was subsequently turned into a win, when Minnesota forfeited the game, thus the official record is 26-3 and not 25-4).  On the season, Tyler averaged a double-double of 17.4 ppg, 11.0 rpg, Long paced the team's scoring with 20.3 ppg, Duerod contributed 11.3 ppg, Boyd, 10.3 ppg, and forward Ron Bostick added 7.1 ppg.

Vitale would be promoted to Athletic Director at the university after the season, and would leave to coach the Detroit Pistons in the NBA in 1978.  Smokey Gaines replaced him as head coach for 1977-78, and led Detroit to a stellar 25-4 record and a #18 ranking with Tyler, Duerod, and Long leading the team, but were denied a NCAA bid and played in the 1978 NIT.  The Titans would return to the 1979 NCAA Division I Basketball Tournament, with Duerod and future NBA center Earl Cureton leading the Titans.  Detroit lost to Lamar 95-87 in the first round.  Detroit finished ranked #20 on the season.

With the Pistons, Vitale drafted Long and Tyler in the 1978 NBA Draft, Duerod in the 1979 NBA Draft and would add Boyd as a free agent in 1978 after he was drafted by the New Orleans Jazz in the 1977 NBA Draft.  Tyler and Long had extensive careers in the NBA and Duerod won a championship playing for the 1980-81 Boston Celtics.  Vitale would be fired by the Pistons and become a prominent college basketball announcer.  At a team reunion, Vitale said, ""The stories get bigger and better.  If you had an opportunity to see these guys play, you were in for an incredible thrill. They were special," adding "We had the Motor City in the palm of our hand.  They were rocking and rolling. I'm so proud to say I had the golden opportunity to be your coach."

Vitale was inducted in the University of Detroit Athletics Hall of Fame in 1993 alongside Terry Duerod.  Terry Tyler and John Long were honored together in 2001.

Roster

Rankings

References

Detroit Mercy Titans men's basketball seasons
Detroit
Detroit
Detroit Titans men's b
Detroit Titans men's b